Summer Song may refer to:

Books
Summer Song, by Henry Thoreau Henry David Thoreau 1962
Summer Song, poems by Alfred Tennyson Tennyson, set to music by Frank Spedding 1960.

Film and TV
Summer Song TV Episode The Wonder Years 1989
Summer Song, film with Amy Jo Johnson 2011

Music
Summer Song (musical) the Music of Dvořák arranged for the stage by Bernard Grun, produced by Eric Maschwitz
Summer Song, for jazz ensemble by Dave Brubeck
Summer Song, for piano and oboe by Miguel del Águila

Albums
Summer Song (soundtrack), the LP recording of Summer Song (musical) 
Summer Song (album) 2001 Mannheim Steamroller album

Songs
"Summersong", a 1962 song by Roy Orbison from the album Crying (album)
A Summer Song, a 1964 song by Chad & Jeremy
Summer Song (Joe Satriani song), 1992
"Summersong", a 2006 song by The Decemberists from the album The Crane Wife
Summer Song (Yui song), 2008